Vignoni may refer to:

David Vignoni (born 1980), an Italian graphic designer
Bagno Vignoni, a village and spa town in Italy